Pepperidge Farm is an American commercial bakery founded in 1937 by Margaret Rudkin, who named the brand after her family's 123-acre farm property in Fairfield, Connecticut, which had been named for the pepperidge tree. 

A subsidiary of the Campbell Soup Company since 1961, it is based in Norwalk, Connecticut. On January 18, 2023, the company announced plans to close their Norwalk headquarters, consolidating jobs held there to Campbell Soup Company headquarters in Camden, New Jersey.

History 
Margaret Rudkin began baking bread in 1937 for her youngest son, Mark, who had asthma and was allergic to most commercially processed foods.  Her son's doctor recommended the bread to his other patients and encouraged her to sell it to the public. Her first commercial sale was to her local grocer in Fairfield, Conn., Mercurio’s Market. Rudkin's husband Henry, a Wall Street broker, began taking loaves of bread with him to New York to be sold in specialty stores. Rudkin moved the growing business out of her kitchen and into her garage, and then into a factory in 1940. Rationing during World War II forced her to cut back production due to the restricted availability of quality ingredients. In 1947, Rudkin opened a modern commercial bakery in Norwalk, Connecticut, and soon after added plants in Illinois and Pennsylvania.

On a trip to Europe in the 1950s, Rudkin discovered fancy chocolate cookies that she believed would be popular in the United States. She bought the rights to produce and sell them, and the Distinctive Cookies line was born. Under her management, Pepperidge Farm continued to expand into other products, including frozen pastry items and, later, the Goldfish snack cracker from Switzerland. In 1961, she sold the business to the Campbell Soup Company for $28 million and became the first woman to serve on its board of directors. She drew on her knowledge and experience to write The Margaret Rudkin Pepperidge Farm Cookbook in 1963, which was the first cookbook ever to make the New York Times Best Seller list.

The Pepperidge Farm logo is based on the Grist Mill in Sudbury, Massachusetts, which supplied the company with 48 tons of whole wheat flour monthly from 1952 to 1967.

Products 
Pepperidge Farm products include Goldfish crackers, varieties of bread, and several lines of cookies. Their cookies are separated into two lines, the Distinctive line and the Farmhouse line. Each type of cookie from the "Distinctive" line is named for a European city such as the Milano cookie or the Brussels cookie. The Distinctives cannot be readily replicated by home bakers. In contrast, the Farmhouse line emphasizes commonplace cookies like chocolate chip and shortbread types that anyone could bake for themselves in an ordinary home kitchen.

List of Pepperidge Farm products
Examples of Pepperidge Farm products include:

See also
 List of bakeries
 List of brand name breads

References

External links
 

Bakeries of the United States
Brand name breads
Brand name crackers
Campbell Soup Company brands
Companies based in Norwalk, Connecticut
Food and drink companies based in Connecticut
American companies established in 1937
Food and drink companies established in 1937
Fairfield, Connecticut
Snack food manufacturers of the United States
Frozen food brands
1937 establishments in Connecticut
1961 mergers and acquisitions